"Shut Up and Dance" is the third episode in the third series of the British science fiction anthology series Black Mirror. It was written by series creator and showrunner Charlie Brooker and William Bridges, and premiered on Netflix on 21 October 2016, together with the rest of series three.

The episode tells the story of a teenage boy (Alex Lawther) who is blackmailed into committing bizarre and criminal acts by a mysterious hacker possessing a video of him masturbating. The boy is joined by a middle-aged man (Jerome Flynn), whom the same hacker is blackmailing over infidelity. The episode is similar to previous Black Mirror episodes, particularly "White Bear", and is dark in tone.

"Shut Up and Dance" received mixed reviews. Critics praised Lawther and Flynn's acting, but were polarised as to whether the episode's tone was effective, whether the plot twist was good and whether the episode had interesting themes. It was ranked poorly in critics' lists of Black Mirror instalments by quality.

Plot
Kenny (Alex Lawther) returns home from his restaurant job to find that his sister Lindsey (Maya Gerber) has unintentionally infected his laptop with malware. Kenny downloads an anti-malware trojan, allowing unseen hackers to record him masturbating through his webcam; they email the teenager, threatening to leak the footage if he refuses to comply.

Feigning illness to leave, he frantically cycles there and is met by another blackmail victim (Ivanno Jeremiah), who passes Kenny a box containing a cake. Ordered to deliver the cake to a hotel room, Kenny meets Hector (Jerome Flynn), whom the hackers also contact; he planned to commit adultery with a prostitute, and fears he will lose custody of his children if his wife Penny (Leanne Best) finds out.

The two are told to drive to a set of coordinates. Stopping for petrol, they meet Karen (Natasha Little), a friend of Hector's wife, who requests a lift home. Hector drives recklessly to get her there before continuing to their destination. Tasked with using a gun concealed in the cake to rob a bank, Hector insists on being the driver, leaving Kenny to perform the robbery. Despite urinating in his panic, he manages to steal a bag of cash and flee the scene with Hector.

Hector is instructed to destroy the car, while Kenny takes the money to a drop-off point in a forest. He meets another victim (Paul Bazely), who explains they are to fight to the death whilst being filmed through a drone; the winner earns the money. When Kenny protests that he was merely masturbating to photos, his opponent asks how young the subjects were, revealing he is a paedophile and implying Kenny is, too. Kenny attempts suicide, but finds the gun is empty. The two fight.

Arriving home, Hector is texted a trollface, finding the blackmailers have sent Penny evidence of his infidelity regardless. The others' information is also released. Having killed the man, a shellshocked Kenny staggers from the woods injured. His distraught mother Sandra (Camilla Power) calls him, screaming that the video of him masturbating to images of children went live and was seen by Lindsey and her friends. Humiliated, exposed as a paedophile and traumatised by the sadistic demands, Kenny tearfully hangs up, receiving a trollface image as police arrive and apprehend the bloodied teen.

Production
Whilst series one and two of Black Mirror were shown on Channel 4 in the UK, in September 2015 Netflix commissioned the series for 12 episodes (split into two series of six episodes). In March 2016, Netflix outbid Channel 4 for the rights to distributing the third series, with a bid of $40 million. Due to its move to Netflix, the show had a larger budget than in previous series. "Shut Up and Dance" is the third episode of the third series; all six episodes in this series were released on Netflix simultaneously on 21 October 2016. As Black Mirror is an anthology series, each episode is standalone.

The titles of the six episodes that make up series 3 were announced in July 2016, along with the release date. A trailer for series three, featuring an amalgamation of clips and sound bites from the six episodes, was released by Netflix on 7 October 2016. Two days prior to the release of series 3 on Netflix, Den of Geek! published an interview in which Brooker hinted that the episode is "a grimy, contemporary nightmare" set in London, with no science fiction elements.

Conception and writing
The episode was co-written by series creator Charlie Brooker and William Bridges, who was new to the television industry. Bridges pitched three ideas to Brooker and executive producer Annabel Jones and although none of them were developed further, he was sent a draft script of "Shut Up and Dance" to work on. Brooker stated that the absence of science fiction elements from the episode was a "very conscious" decision, noting that science fiction is also absent from series one episode "The National Anthem" and series two episode "The Waldo Moment". Having recently written series three episode "San Junipero", which was conceived of as a 1980s period piece, Brooker was interested in writing a present-day story. He commented that the "weird, British, colloquial nasty humour" and "seediness" of the episode is similar to "The National Anthem".

The story went through many different iterations, starting from an idea similar to 1992 heist film Reservoir Dogs, where a group of strangers were tossed together to commit a robbery. Some drafts did not imply that Kenny was looking at child pornography. In one version of the story, there was no reason why the events were happening, and in another the roles were reversed, with Hector having the extremely dark secret. In a different draft, the hackers were shown in an internet cafe in Eastern Europe, having blackmailed the characters for fun. The episode was originally set in the United States, as this would make it easier for the characters to access a gun, and the timeframe of the storyline was initially longer.

Filming

The episode was filmed over a three-week period; it was the second in the series to be filmed, after "San Junipero". Director James Watkins had previously directed horror films Eden Lake (2008) and The Woman in Black (2012), which Lawther says made Watkins "really [learn] the craft of sustaining incredible suspense over long periods of time." It was Watkins' first experience directing television. Having seen art department preparations for series three episodes "Nosedive" and "San Junipero", Watkins aimed to deviate from their tones to "embrace being the ugly cousin". Alex Lawther plays the main character Kenny; having been a fan of the programme prior to auditioning, Lawther particularly liked series two episode "White Bear". When first auditioning, Lawther had only seen the script for a couple of scenes and was unaware of the twist ending.

Lawther's first proper meeting with co-star Jerome Flynn was during shooting of in the in-car scenes. Filming was intense, with Flynn hyperventilating at times, though there was also corpsing (breaking into laughter) from Flynn, Lawther and Natasha Little, who played Hector's wife's friend Karen. Lawther played Kenny as if he were innocent, as his character is very repressed about his sexual proclivities. He also believed that Kenny feels constantly uncomfortable. Kenny handing a toy back to the girl who had left it behind in the cafe was intended as a hint to Kenny being a paedophile; there were discussions over how the scene should be acted to avoid giving away the twist. After struggling to find a parent who was happy to have their daughter act as the girl, Jones had her own daughter play the role. Lawther commented that whilst filming, he saw a news story similar to the episode's storyline, which he found surreal.

The ending features Radiohead's "Exit Music (For a Film)", initially included as a temporary track during editing. The producers received permission from Radiohead to use the song as they liked Black Mirror.

Analysis
The episode was found to be the most similar to prior Black Mirror episodes out of those in the third series. Pat Stacey of the Irish Independent noted that it is the only episode of the series set entirely in England, whilst Alex Mullane of Digital Spy compared it to a "British version" of 1995 action film Die Hard with a Vengeance, as the main character "is led on a not-so-merry chase around the city". Sean Fitz-Gerald of Thrillist wrote that it is a "dark thriller" which is both "a very atypical and very classic Black Mirror story". The episode's tone was seen by Robbie Collin of The Daily Telegraph as the "most nihilistic" Black Mirror episode to that point; he commented that its "vision of humanity" is "uncompromisingly negative" and that it leaves an "acrid aftertaste".

Stuart Joy, writer of the book Through the Black Mirror: Deconstructing the Side Effects of the Digital Age, analysed that the portrayal of Kenny as youthful deceives the viewer and challenges societal perceptions of paedophiles. Lawther said of the script: "How brilliant [it was] that they'd made me sympathize with a paedophile for so long, and the complexity of that, because he's so young". His character is 19 years old, a withdrawn and socially-awkward teenager who is easily intimidated by workplace bullies and infantilised by his mother. Joy noted that Kenny's attitude towards sex is indicative of immaturity. Questioned by the much older Hector about what the hackers had caught him doing, Kenny refuses to say the word "masturbation", instead using the euphemism "doing it". Other moments emphasizing his childlike nature include a series of nervous tics, twitches and stutters exhibited by Kenny, as well as a moment where he urinates himself out of terror when forced to commit a bank robbery.

Sophie Gilbert of The Atlantic compared the episode to previous episodes with contemporary settings—series one's "The National Anthem" and series two's "White Bear" and "The Waldo Moment". She also compared it to the 2001 special episode "Paedogeddon!" of the television news satire Brass Eye, which Brooker co-wrote. "Paedogeddon!" aimed to "lampoon the kind of moral panic and mob fury that's unleashed whenever the subject of child abuse is up for debate". Fitz-Gerald, Gilbert and Zack Handlen of The A.V. Club commented that the episode's themes resemble those in "White Bear". Handlen wrote that the audience must question "the danger of unsupervised vigilantism even when the victims arguably deserve what's coming to them", calling Kenny a "still sympathetic" character "not deserving" of his punishment, though he is "disturbed and troubled and in need of some serious counseling". Fitz-Gerald believed that all of the characters are "depraved [...] to a degree", noting that the internet brings out bad behaviour in people.

Handlen called the episode "one of the most pervasive nightmares of the modern age", as it asks: "What if someone's watching you at your most vulnerable?" Mullane opined that the episode is "a cautionary tale about placing yourself in precarious positions online, particularly when it comes to sexting, images, and pornography". Fitz-Gerald summarised that the episode was a "hypothetical extreme" of hacking and trolling, and asked whether human nature and advanced technology are compatible. However, Caroline Framke of Vox believed that although the episode "might ostensibly be about the dangers of hacking, or trying to live a double life in a world that makes secrets all too easy to access", it relies on the feeling of shame. The episode asks: "How far would you go to keep your shame safely hidden?"

Josh Dzieza of The Verge commented that the anonymous hackers mark "a bit of a departure" for the programme, which usually does not feature "overt villains". Mullane analysed that the hackers' identities do not need to be revealed as they are "effectively a stand-in for The Internet: all-seeing, all-knowing, and extremely dangerous". The supposed malware remover that Kenny downloads is called "shrive", a word from Middle English meaning "to prescribe penance" (the same root word is used for Shrove Tuesday). Gilbert commented that in light of this, "the gauntlet Kenny, Hector, and others are forced to run throughout the episode seems to be a kind of punishment for their sins, but at the end, none of them are forgiven".

Reception
Rotten Tomatoes reported that 65% of critics have given the episode a positive review based on 23 reviews, with an average rating of 8.50/10. The site's critics consensus reads, "Terrifically tense and twisty, "Shut Up and Dance" is well-paced and incredibly unsettling, leaving viewers stunned and with a greater distaste for humanity than normally evoked from an average episode Black Mirror." "Shut Up and Dance" received ratings of five out of five stars by Robbie Collin of The Daily Telegraph, four out of five stars by Pat Stacey of The Irish Independent and a B class rating by Zack Handlen of The A.V. Club. The episode's themes received mixed reception. Mullane wrote that the story was no deeper than one where "bad people do bad things and then get punished for it". Gilbert called it redundant to series two episode "White Bear", saying that there was "no clear message or moment of redemption to take away from it". However, Handlen approved of the episode's themes, praising its "willingness to force moral questions that make everyone feel awful".

Alex Lawther's performance as Kenny was universally well received. Described by Tim Goodman of The Hollywood Reporter as "one of the best things of 2016", Handlen concurred that Lawther is "the real stand-out" of the episode, while Mullane wrote that he is "superb in the main role". Dzieza praised Lawther's portrayal of "adolescent desperation", whilst Framke commented that his depiction of Kenny was "quivering, desperate, heartbreaking". Framke stated that Lawther's "incredible, vulnerable performance" made her "sympathise with his terror", which she found crucial to the twist.

Jerome Flynn's acting of Hector was also praised. Mullane wrote that his character is "suitably sleazy, without ever being a caricature", whilst Framke praised his "coiled anger", describing the character as "gruff and to the point" and "furious at his total helplessness". Dzieza praised Flynn's "unsettling" contrast between "gruffness and utilitarian friendliness". Collin opined that "the deliciously horrible details of Flynn’s performance sell you on his character's predicament in a snap". However, Handlen commented that though Flynn "does a fine job", the episode is not a "showcase" for him.

Critics were polarised as to whether the tone of the episode was effective. Whilst Matt Fowler of IGN wrote that it was "remarkably heart-pounding" and Stacey found it "fantastically tense", Gilbert commented that it "felt like too much of an endurance test" and Framke believed that there was not much suspense prior to the twist ending. Fitz-Gerald experienced a "mounting sense of anxiety" as "Kenny's hopelessness as a puppet to anonymous sociopaths is palpable", but Adam Chitwood of Collider found the tension too frustrating, and Handlen wrote that the episode is "never boring, but it's not all that engaging, either". Gilbert found it more upsetting than any prior episode, and Dzieza commented that the episode's aesthetics are "chilly and claustrophobic". Dzieza further said that the "queasiness" up to the twist is "well orchestrated", but found the ending "a letdown". Stacey said that the episode was "blackly funny", with Gilbert concurring that the scenes involving Hector's wife's friend Karen contained some of the darkest humour of the show.

The twist ending in which Kenny is revealed to be a paedophile received a mixed reaction from critics. Handlen opined that it is "not quite powerful enough to make up for everything that came before it", with Framke agreeing that it "doesn't hit that hard". Fitz-Gerald said that "I half hate it, half love it." Mullane called it "a huge gut-punch", but criticised that "it also removes any anchor for investment in any of these characters". Dzieza commented that it demonstrated that "the episode is more interested in turning gadgets into weapons of maximum humiliation than in saying anything more interesting about how digital humiliation works". However, Mullane opined that the episode's ending "perfectly captures the bleak mood of the piece and the inescapable claustrophobia of these people's situations".

Director James Watkins was praised by Mullane and Collin for creating tension, with Collin writing that Watkins "keeps his camera on its feet and hungry" during moments of tension and Kenny's chase sequences. However, the episode was criticised as too long by Framke and Chitwood, with Framke attributing this to the programme's move to Netflix.

Black Mirror episode rankings
"Shut Up and Dance" appeared on many critics' rankings of the 23 instalments in the Black Mirror series, from best to worst.

 8th – Matt Donnelly and Tim Molloy, TheWrap
 8th – Corey Atad, Esquire
 15th – Morgan Jeffery and Rosie Fletcher, Digital Spy
 15th – Charles Bramesco, Vulture

 18th – Ed Power, The Telegraph
 19th – Aubrey Page, Collider
 19th – Travis Clark, Business Insider
 23rd – James Hibberd, Entertainment Weekly

Following the fifth series, Brian Tallerico of Vulture rated Lawther's performance as Kenny the eleventh best performance in the show. Additionally, Proma Khosla of Mashable ranked the 22 Black Mirror instalments excluding Bandersnatch by tone, concluding that "Shut Up and Dance" was the second most bleak after "The Waldo Moment".

The episode also appears on critics' rankings of the 19 episodes from series 1 to series 4:
 4th – Eric Anthony Glover, Entertainment Tonight
 17th – Steve Greene, Hanh Nguyen and Liz Shannon Miller, IndieWire

Other critics ranked the 13 episodes in Black Mirrors first three series.
 4th (of the Top Ten) – Brendan Doyle, Comingsoon.net
 10th – Mat Elfring, GameSpot
 11th – Andrew Wallenstein, Variety
 13th – Jacob Hall, /Film
 13th – Adam David, CNN Philippines

Some critics ranked the six episodes from series three of Black Mirror in order of quality.

 1st – Jacob Stolworthy and Christopher Hooton, The Independent
 2nd – Liam Hoofe, Flickering Myth

See also
 Blue Whale Challenge
 Momo Challenge hoax

References

External links
 

2016 British television episodes
Black Mirror episodes
Television episodes about malware
Television episodes about Internet culture
Internet trolling
Television episodes written by Charlie Brooker
Drones in fiction
Netflix original television series episodes
Television episodes about pedophilia
Television episodes about bank robbery
Television episodes about murder